Protein propionylation is a post-translational modification that is characterized by the addition of a propionyl-group to a lysine amino acid residue of a protein. Lysine propionylation was first identified on histone proteins. but was later also identified on non-histone proteins. Although the role of protein propionylation is till not completely elucidated, histone propionylation has been observed to be a mark of active chromatin. The substrate for protein propionylation is propionyl-CoA. Propionyl-CoA in the cell is metabolised by the enzyme propionyl-CoA carboxylase. In patients with propionic acidemia, a rare autosomal recessive metabolic disorder, propionyl-CoA levels elevated and increased propionylation has been observed, which might contribute to the pathology in these patients.

References 

Post-translational modification